South Tuckahoe Historic District is located in the Tuckahoe section of Upper Township, Cape May County, New Jersey, United States. The district was added to the National Register of Historic Places on March 7, 1997.

See also
National Register of Historic Places listings in Cape May County, New Jersey

References

Historic districts on the National Register of Historic Places in New Jersey
Houses on the National Register of Historic Places in New Jersey
Federal architecture in New Jersey
Gothic Revival architecture in New Jersey
Italianate architecture in New Jersey
Geography of Cape May County, New Jersey
National Register of Historic Places in Cape May County, New Jersey
Upper Township, New Jersey
Houses in Cape May County, New Jersey
New Jersey Register of Historic Places